Wendall Keehn Harrington is an American theatrical projection designer and head of projection design at Yale School of Drama, sometimes referred to as 'The Queen of Projections’. She has been considered the nation's leading projection designer for more than three decades.

Credits include over 35 Broadway shows, and numerous awards for her designs.

"In many ways, the modern era of projections on Broadway — and, by extension, in the rest of the theatre — began with Wendall K. Harrington, who designed a number of productions that proved to be technological and aesthetic milestones... It was Harrington's work on the 1992 musical The Who's Tommy that arguably set the stage for the modern projections era."

Considered the ‘godmother’ of modern theater projection in New York, many of her former assistants have gone on to Broadway careers including Zachary Borovay (Rock of Ages), Sage Carter (One Flew Over The Cuckoo's Nest), Michael Clark (Jersey Boys) and Elaine J. McCarthy (Wicked) as well as Hope Hall who went on to serve as the Principal Presidential Videographer and Archive Lead for the Office of Digital Strategy for President Barack Obama.

She currently lives in New York City.

Early life and education 

Harrington was born and raised in Queens, NY. In the 1960s she attended Hunter College, studied at the Graduate Center of the City University of New York as a freshman and studied Art history with Leo Steinberg. She began her career apprenticing as a filmmaker on a number of experimental films before transitioning into advertising at Esquire Magazine, and then projection design in 1978.

Design career 

Harrington began her career as a projections designer on Broadway's 1979 production of They're Playing Our Song directed by Robert Moore and starring Robert Klein and Lucie Arnaz. That same year, she also designed Broadway's The Elephant Man, and the musical I Remember Mama.  Throughout the years, she continued to serve as projection designer for shows, both on and off-Broadway and nationwide, notably The Will Rogers Follies, Disney's Beauty And The Beast, Company (1995 Rvival), Paul Simon's The Capeman, The Music Man, Children of a Lesser God, The Glass Menagerie, The Human Comedy, The Heidi Chronicles, Into the Woods, A Christmas Carol. and Grey Gardens.

Harrington also designed Lincoln Center's productions of Four Baboons Adoring the Sun, Racing Demon and Hapgood. In 1983, she began designing for opera shows worldwide, such as The Photographer composed by Philip Glass at the (Brooklyn Academy of Music), The Magic Flute (Florence), Orfeo ed Euridice (Vienna and Zurich), and Benjamin Britten's Chamber opera The Turn of the Screw (Copenhagen), the Minnesota Opera's The Grapes of Wrath and the Metropolitan Opera's production of the opera Werther, by Jules Massenet.

In 1995, she began designing projections for ballet, notably the American Ballet Theatre's Othello, the San Francisco Ballet production of The Nutcracker, Alexei Ratmansky's Anna Karenina for the Mariinsky Ballet and the New York City Ballet's production of Modest Mussorgsky's Pictures at an Exhibition

Harrington continued to expand her projections designing experience on various concerts and tours, including The Talking Heads Stop Making Sense, Simon & Garfunkel's Old Friends Tour, two of Chris Rock's comedy tours (Blind Ambition and No Excuses), and John Fogerty's Deja Vu Tour. She also devoted her time designing projections for special events, such as Esquire magazine's 50th Anniversary party. She designed player introductions for The New York Knicks, New York Liberty, and New York Rangers at Madison Square Garden, as well as the 2000 All-Star halftime show.

Other works 

In 1978 she founded Luminous! Productions, Inc. where for six years she produced and directed multi-image and video projects for numerous corporate clients. The Multi-Image Murders and Fifty Who Made the Difference won several awards, including Gold Awards from IFPA, The Chicago Film Festival and the U.S. Industrial Film Festival. From 1988-1990, she served as a producer for a variety of Whittle Communications’ documentaries. Her work in the multi-image/video field includes the 1991 Words on Fire. She produced this half-hour program for PBS affiliate KTCA and Alive from Off Center.

Harrington was also responsible for the re-design and re-launch of Esquire magazine in 1986. As design director for Esquire, she conceived and edited Randy Shiltsís’ My Life on the AIDS Tour, which was nominated for a National Magazine Award and published in Best American Essays of 1990.

Harrington sits on the American Theatre Wing's Tony Award Nominating Committee.

Academic career 

Harrington began her academic career in 1995 giving seminars in Broadway master lighting classes, which she helped to create, in universities along America's northeastern region, notably New York University, Yale University, Virginia Commonwealth University, and Long Island University. From 2005 to 2009, she served as lecturer on Projection for Performance at the Yale School of Drama's Design Department.  In 2009 the co-chairs of the Design Department Ming Cho Lee and Stephen Strawbridge, announced that Wendall was to head the departments new projection concentration. The program began in the fall of 2010 and is one of the first graduate theatre training programs of its kind in the United States.

Awards and nominations 

Other

1980 Multi -Image Murders AMI International Gold Award for Best Concept and Script

1984 50 Who Made a Difference (IFPA Gold Award, The Gold Hugo from Chicago International Film Festival and First Place, Gold Camera from the US Industrial Film Festival)

References

External links 

Living people
Opera designers
People from Queens, New York
Theatre designers
American scenic designers
Broadway projection and video designers
Drama Desk Award winners
Year of birth missing (living people)
Hunter College alumni
Graduate Center, CUNY alumni
Yale School of Drama faculty